Teshenawa is an extinct Afro-Asiatic language formerly spoken in Teshena town of Kafin Hausa LGA, Jigawa State, Nigeria.

Notes 

West Chadic languages
Languages of Nigeria
Extinct languages of Africa